Belcastro is a comune in the province of Catanzaro, in the Calabria region of southern Italy.

History 
The small town of Belcastro is situated on a rocky spur crowned by a Norman-style castle that belonged to the counts of Aquino. Some propose it as the birthplace of Saint Thomas Aquinas, more commonly taken to have been born in the castle of Roccasecca, not far from Aquino. Feudo for some centuries of the Lords of Aquino, in 1330 by decree of the King of Naples, Robert of Anjou, became a county and changed its name from Geneocastro to Belcastro (Bellicastrum), as a tribute to the beauty of the place and gratification to Thomas 'Aquino, first count of the city and nephew of the saint. In the 15th century it was given the title of city. The historian Lutio d'Orsi   (16th and 17th centuries) and jurist Giuseppe Poerio (1775-1843), patriot of the Italian Risorgimento and father of the poet Alessandro Poerio, also a patriot, were born in Belcastro.

Its population is now reduced to about 1400 (2017).

References 

Cities and towns in Calabria